Malynsk is a village in Rivne Raion of Rivne Oblast of Ukraine, but was formerly administered within Berezne Raion. According to the 2001 census, has a population of 1,700 inhabitants.

Gallery

External links

 berezne.rv.ua 

Villages in Rivne Raion